TodaysArt is the annual international festival for Art, Music and Technology in The Hague, Netherlands that takes place in the end of September. It is also the name of the cultural production agency TodaysArt (Stichting The Generator) that produces the festival and other TodaysArt branded events. The festival offers a selection of art and entertainment that can be described as experimental or cutting-edge, while the music program, though varied, usually features a considerable amount of electronic music. The festival is staged in a shifting selection of venues around the city, many of which are usually not used for art or performances.

The artists come from a variety of countries, are tasked by the festival with presenting their creative vision about what Art is Today in terms of music, video and visual arts, film, photography, fashion, performing arts, theatre, contemporary dance and the other disciplines and crossovers that the festival features.

The productions and performances are often made especially for the festival.

Other events 
TodaysArt are among the 8 major festivals that make up the We Are Europe association. They collaborate on the SHAPE creative platform along with 15 other festivals, focusing on 48 emerging artists each year. They also interact with other cultural institutions through the International Cities of Advanced Sound.

The festival has collaborated on a long list of events and other festivals, with some bearing the TodaysArt brand.  Among such collaborators are the Arts Council of Mongolia at the  Ulaanbaatar International Media Art Festival, the Sónar Festival in Barcelona, Insomnia Festival, Nuits Sonores, Intonal Festival, CTM Festival, Rokolectiv Festival REUSE festival in Kuwait  National Centre for Contemporary Arts in Moscow, and the Tehran Annual Digital Art Exhibition (TADAEX).

See also

List of experimental music festivals
List of electronic music festivals

References

External links

Music festivals established in 2003
Experimental music festivals
2003 establishments in the Netherlands
Electronic music festivals in the Netherlands
Electroacoustic music festivals
New media art festivals
Culture in The Hague